Pirbalout (also Romanized as Pīr Balūţ, Pīr Ballūţ, and Pīrbalūt) is a village in Howmeh Rural District, in the Central District of Shahrekord County, Chaharmahal and Bakhtiari Province, Iran. At the 2006 census, its population was 2,307, in 563 families. The village is populated by Turkic people.

References 

Populated places in Shahr-e Kord County